Uzbekistan competed at the 2016 Summer Olympics in Rio de Janeiro, Brazil, from 5 to 21 August 2016. This was the nation's sixth consecutive appearance at the Summer Olympics in the post-Soviet era.

The National Olympic Committee of the Republic of Uzbekistan fielded a team of 70 athletes, 47 men and 23 women, across 15 sports at the Games. It was the nation's second-largest delegation sent to the Olympics, just a single athlete short of the record achieved in Sydney 2000 (71). Uzbekistan made its Olympic debut in women's boxing, men's table tennis, and the rhythmic gymnastics group all-around, as well as returning to artistic gymnastics, women's judo, and rowing after their absence from London 2012.

Leading the Uzbek roster lineup were Oksana Chusovitina, who created history as the oldest ever female gymnast (aged 41) and the first to participate in a record seventh Olympics, and Ekaterina Khilko, who became the only trampolinist to be featured in every Olympic competition since her sport was added to the program in Sydney 2000. Chusovitina's fellow gymnast Anton Fokin, along with judo legends Rishod Sobirov and Abdullo Tangriev, also highlighted the Uzbek team for being the only medalists returning to these Games.

Other notable athletes on the Uzbek roster included world's top-ranked taekwondo fighter Dmitriy Shokin in the men's +80 kg division, American-based freestyle wrestler and Asian Games champion Bekzod Abdurakhmonov (men's 74 kg), tennis player Denis Istomin, Asia's top female high jumper Svetlana Radzivil, and super heavyweight boxer Bakhodir Jalolov, who was nominated by the committee as the nation's flag bearer in the opening ceremony.

Uzbekistan left Rio de Janeiro with a total of 13 medals (4 gold, 2 silver, and 7 bronze), signifying the nation's most successful outcome in Olympic history. Seven of these medals won by the Uzbeks came from boxing, including three golds. The remainder of the nation's overall tally were awarded to the team in weightlifting, wrestling, and judo. Among the medalists were Hasanboy Dusmatov, who became the nation's second boxer in history to claim an Olympic gold since Mahammatkodir Abdullaev topped the podium in 2000, Ruslan Nurudinov, who successfully set a new Olympic clean and jerk record to hand the Uzbeks its first ever weightlifting title, and Sobirov, who wrapped up his judo career by achieving a bronze-medal feat for the third straight time, before retiring from the sport.

Medalists

The following Uzbek competitors won medals at the Games. In the discipline sections below, medalists' names are bolded. 

|  style="text-align:left; width:78%; vertical-align:top;"|

|  style="text-align:left; width:22%; vertical-align:top;"|

Competitors

| width=78% align=left valign=top |
The following is the list of number of competitors participating in the Games:

Athletics
 
Uzbek athletes have so far achieved qualifying standards in the following athletics events (up to a maximum of 3 athletes in each event):

Track & road events
Men

Women

Field events
Men

Women

Combined events – Men's decathlon

Combined events – Women's heptathlon

Boxing

Uzbekistan has entered eleven boxers to compete in each of the following weight classes into the Olympic boxing tournament. 2012 Olympian Hurshid Tojibaev was the only Uzbek finishing among the top two of his respective division in the AIBA Pro Boxing series, while three further boxers (Akhmadaliev, Gaibnazarov, and Melikuziev) qualified through the 2015 World Championships.

Seven further boxers (Dusmatov, Zoirov, Giyasov, Rasulov, Tulaganov, Jalolov, and Mirzaeva) had claimed their Olympic spots at the 2016 Asia & Oceania Qualification Tournament in Qian'an, China.

Men

Women

Canoeing

Sprint
Uzbek canoeists have qualified four boats in each of the following distances for the Games through the 2015 Asian Canoe Sprint Championships in Palembang, Indonesia.

Qualification Legend: FA = Qualify to final (medal); FB = Qualify to final B (non-medal)

Gymnastics

Artistic
Uzbekistan has entered two artistic gymnasts into the Olympic competition. Beijing 2008 bronze medalist Anton Fokin, and seven-time Olympian Oksana Chusovitina had claimed their Olympic spots each in the men's and women's apparatus and all-around events, respectively, at the Olympic Test Event in Rio de Janeiro.

Men

Women

Rhythmic 
Uzbekistan has qualified a squad of rhythmic gymnasts in both individual and group all-around for the Games by claiming one of eight available Olympic spots (for individual) and three (for group) at the Olympic Test Event in Rio de Janeiro.

Trampoline
Uzbekistan has qualified one gymnast in the women's trampoline by virtue of a top six finish at the 2016 Olympic Test Event in Rio de Janeiro.

Judo

Uzbekistan has qualified a total of eight judokas for each of the following weight classes at the Games. Six men, led by two-time Olympic medalist Rishod Sobirov and Beijing 2008 runner-up Abdullo Tangriev, were ranked among the top 22 eligible judokas in the IJF World Ranking List of May 30, 2016. Gulnoza Matniyazova at women's middleweight (70 kg) earned a continental quota spot from the Asian region, as the highest-ranked Uzbek judoka outside of direct qualifying position, while Soyib Kurbanov at men's half-heavyweight (100 kg) received the unused place from IJF as the highest-ranked judoka, not yet qualified, across all continents on the list, as Oceania failed to fulfill its continental allocation.

Men

Women

Rowing

Uzbekistan has qualified one boat in the men's single sculls for the Olympics at the 2016 Asia & Oceania Continental Qualification Regatta in Chungju, South Korea.

Qualification Legend: FA=Final A (medal); FB=Final B (non-medal); FC=Final C (non-medal); FD=Final D (non-medal); FE=Final E (non-medal); FF=Final F (non-medal); SA/B=Semifinals A/B; SC/D=Semifinals C/D; SE/F=Semifinals E/F; QF=Quarterfinals;  R=Repechage

Shooting
 
Uzbekistan has received a wildcard invitation from ISSF to send 2014 Asian Youth champion Vadim Skorovarov in the men's air rifle to the Olympics, as long as the minimum qualifying score (MQS) was met by March 31, 2016.

Qualification Legend: Q = Qualify for the next round; q = Qualify for the bronze medal (shotgun)

Swimming

Uzbek swimmers have so far achieved qualifying standards in the following events (up to a maximum of 2 swimmers in each event at the Olympic Qualifying Time (OQT), and potentially 1 at the Olympic Selection Time (OST)):

Table tennis

Uzbekistan has entered one athlete into the table tennis competition at the Games for the second time (the first being done in 2004). Zokhid Kenjaev scored a second-stage draw victory to book one of six remaining Olympic spots in the men's singles at the Asian Qualification Tournament in Hong Kong.

Taekwondo
 
Uzbekistan entered one athlete into the taekwondo competition at the Olympics. 2015 World champion Dmitriy Shokin qualified automatically for the men's heavyweight category (+80 kg) by finishing in the top 6 WTF Olympic rankings. Meanwhile, Nikita Rafalovich and Nigora Tursunkulova secured spots on the Uzbek team by virtue of their top two finish in the men's (80 kg) and women's welterweight category (67 kg), respectively, at the 2016 Asian Qualification Tournament in Manila, Philippines.

Tennis

Uzbekistan has entered one tennis player into the Olympic tournament. London 2012 Olympian Denis Istomin (world no. 64) qualified directly for the men's singles as one of the top 56 eligible players in the ATP World Rankings as of June 6, 2016.

Weightlifting

Uzbek weightlifters have qualified five men's quota places for the Rio Olympics based on their combined team standing by points at the 2014 and 2015 IWF World Championships. A single women's Olympic spot had been added to the Uzbek roster by virtue of a top six national finish at the 2016 Asian Championships (April 22 to 30), but the International Weightlifting Federation had decided to remove it two months later because of "multiple positive cases" of doping throughout the qualifying period. The team must allocate these places to individual athletes by June 20, 2016.

Wrestling

Uzbekistan has qualified eight wrestlers for each of the following weight classes into the Olympic competition. Two of them finished among the top six to book Olympic spots in the men's freestyle 65 kg and men's Greco-Roman 85 kg, respectively, at the 2015 World Championships, while one more place had been awarded to the Uzbek wrestler, who progressed to the top two finals at the 2016 Asian Qualification Tournament.

Five further wrestlers had claimed the remaining Olympic slots to round out the Uzbek roster in separate World Qualification Tournaments; three of them at the initial meet in Ulaanbaatar and two more at the final meet in Istanbul.

See also
Uzbekistan at the 2016 Summer Paralympics

References

External links

 

Olympics
Nations at the 2016 Summer Olympics
2016
|}